Tony Doyle (born 26 April 1958) in Dublin is a former Irish rugby union international player who played for the Irish national rugby union team. He played as a scrum-half.
He played for the Ireland team in 1984, winning 2 caps and was part of the Ireland squad at the 1987 Rugby World Cup.

References

External links
ESPN Profile

1958 births
Living people
Irish rugby union players
Ireland international rugby union players
People educated at Presentation College, Bray
Rugby union players from Dublin (city)
Rugby union scrum-halves